Nasreddine Megdich (born 29 August 1991) is a Qatari handball player for Al Rayyan and the Qatari national team.

He participated at the 2016 Summer Olympics in Rio de Janeiro, in the men's handball tournament.

External links
 Nasreddine Megdich on scoresway
 Nasreddine Megdich eurosport

References

1991 births
Living people
Qatari male handball players
Olympic handball players of Qatar
Handball players at the 2016 Summer Olympics